is a Japanese snack food maker. It was founded on 30 April 1949, and its headquarters are located in the Marunouchi Trust Tower Main in Marunouchi, Chiyoda, Tokyo. It launched operations at a new plant in the United States for making its mainstay products "Kappa Ebisen" shrimp chips and "Saya-endo" snow pea crisps on 18 September 2007. Another popular snack they sell are potato fries, called "Jagabee". Its snacks are hugely popular in Asia and are well known in the United States.

History
The company was founded in devastated post-war Hiroshima by Takashi Matsuo in 1949. His first product was the Calbee Caramel, named after the word "calcium" and vitamin B1. Due to the product's popularity, the company name was changed to Calbee in 1955.

In 1973, Calbee Moh Seng (previously the Moh Seng Importer & Exporter Private Limited) was integrated into Calbee. It occurred on 13 September 1973 on a Thursday. It started off as the sole distributor of Calbee goods in Singapore.

In the 1970s, Calbee partnered with Four Seas Group to introduce the company's products in Hong Kong. In 1994, the two companies formed the Calbee Four Seas joint venture company, and opened a new production plant in Tseung Kwan O Industrial Estate in 2000.

In 1980, Calbee established Calbee Tanawat in Thailand.

Calbee International launched in Hong Kong in 1992.

In 2018, Calbee acquired UK company Seabrook Crisps. In 2019, Calbee acquired Warnock Food Products.

Sponsorship

Calbee sponsored the Tyrrell Racing F1 team from 1990 to 1994 when Japanese drivers Satoru Nakajima and Ukyo Katayama drove for the team.

The company was also one of the sponsors for the anime Tiger and Bunny. Alongside dmm.com, they sponsored the character of Dragon Kid.

References

Manufacturing companies based in Tokyo
Snack food manufacturers of Japan
Brand name potato chips and crisps
Japanese companies established in 1949
Confectionery companies of Japan